Timez Are Weird These Days is the debut studio album by the American rapper Theophilus London. It was released on July 19, 2011, by Reprise Records. The album entered the US Billboard R&B/Hip-Hop Albums chart at number 30 and the Rap Albums chart at number 21 for the week of August 6, 2011.

Singles 
The album's first single "Last Name London" was released on June 27, 2011.

Track listing

Release history

References 

2011 debut albums
Hip hop albums by American artists
Reprise Records albums
Albums produced by Ariel Rechtshaid
Theophilus London albums